Hair is a protein filament that grows from follicles in the skin.

Hair may also refer to:

Art and entertainment

Films and musicals
 Hair (musical), a 1967 rock musical
 Hair (film), a 1979 film adaptation of the musical
 The Hair (film), a 1974 Finnish erotic thriller

Television
 Hair (TV series), a 2014–2015 British reality series
 "Hair" (Men Behaving Badly), a 1996 episode
 "Hair" (Roseanne), a 1990 episode

Albums
 Hair (Original Off-Broadway Cast Recording), 1967
 Hair (Original Broadway Cast Recording), 1968
 Hair (Original London Cast Recording), 1968
 Hair: Original Soundtrack Recording, 1979
 Hair (Stan Kenton album), 1969
 Hair (White Fence album), 2012

Songs

 "Hair" (The Lucid song)

 "Hair" (Hair song), from the musical
 "Hair" (Lady Gaga song), 2011
 "Hair" (Little Mix song), 2016
 "Hair", by Ashley Tisdale from Guilty Pleasure, 2009
 "Hair", by the Early November from The Mother, the Mechanic, and the Path, 2006
 "Hair", by PJ Harvey from Dry, 1992
 "Hair", by Stanley Clarke from 1, 2, to the Bass, 2003

People

Surname 
 Alex Hair (1898–1970), Scottish footballer
 Alfred Hair (1941–1970), American painter
 Ben Hair (1892–1974), Australian rules footballer
 Darrell Hair (born 1952), Australian cricket umpire
 David Hair, New Zealand writer
 George Hair (1925–1994), English professional footballer
 Graham Hair (born 1943), Australian composer, music scholar, and retired academic
 Grenville Hair (1931–1968), English footballer
 Thomas Hair (musician) (1779–1854), British violinist and Northumbrian smallpipes player
 Thomas Harrison Hair (1808–1875), British artist
 Warren Hair (1918–2006), American professional basketball player
 William Hair (fl. 1920s), Scottish footballer

Given name 
 Hair Zeqiri (born 1988), Albanian professional footballer

Other uses
 Bristle, a stiff hair or feather
 Fur, hair that covers the skin of many animals
 Hair's breadth, an informal unit of very short length
 Hairy (gene), a sequence of nucleotides
 Seta, a number of different bristle- or hair-like structures on living organisms
 Trichome, a slender outgrowth on plants, algae, lichens, and certain protists

See also
 al-Ha'ir Prison, Riyadh, Saudi Arabia 
 Hare (disambiguation)